Patricia Huntingford (born 12 July 1940) is an Australian former swimmer. She competed in the women's 100 metre backstroke at the 1956 Summer Olympics.

References

External links
 

1940 births
Living people
Olympic swimmers of Australia
Swimmers at the 1956 Summer Olympics
Place of birth missing (living people)
Australian female backstroke swimmers